J. Roberts & Son is a British manufacturer of shotguns and rifles.

References

Companies based in West Sussex
Manufacturing companies established in 1953
Manufacturing companies of England
Firearm manufacturers of the United Kingdom
Privately held companies based in London
Ammunition manufacturers
1953 establishments in England